The Siksika Nation (syllabics ) is a First Nation in southern Alberta, Canada. The name Siksiká comes from the Blackfoot words sik (black) and iká (foot), with a connector s between the two words. The plural form of Siksiká is Siksikáwa. The Siksikáwa are the northernmost of the Niitsítapi (Original People), all of whom speak dialects of Blackfoot, an Algonquian language.

When European explorers travelled west, they most likely met the Siksiká first.  The four Niitsítapi nations of the Blackfoot Confederacy are the Siksiká, Káínaa (Kainai or Blood), Aapátohsipikáni (Northern Peigan), and Aamsskáápipikani (South Peigan or Montana Blackfoot). The approximate population of the Siksika Nation, as of 2009, is 6,000 people.

Economic and social stimulus of the Siksika Nation

Siksika Resource Development Limited 
The Siksika nations economic authority is the Siksika Resource Development Limited (SRDL) founded in 1997. They manage a diverse group of enterprises and properties.  

The SRDL applied for a licence to produce Medical Marijuana in April 2016. They anticipate generating $15M in annual revenue. The Siksika Resource Development Ltd, and Siksika Herbz Ltd, and Frozen Penguin Ltd of Kelowna BC  partnership plan to construct 25,000 Sq ft facility  on the Siksika Nation. Revenue generated will also be donated to support social services.

The Siksika intend to distribute the medication domestically and internationally. Revenue from the venture is intended to address disparaging economic issues such as Opioid addiction epidemic, and housing.  As of 2020 the proposal is still under review. Frozen Penguin will use modern technology and techniques such as 'RotoGro', to maximize profits for the nation.

On July 16, 2022. The SRDL partnered with 'Calgary Tree Planting Team' volunteers to plant 300 Sakskatoon berry trees near the "Siksika business Plaza". The initiative will increase food security and provide economic growth for the Nation.

Siksika Family Services Corporation/Siksika Children's Services 

The Siksika Family Services was awarded a grant by the Provincial and Federal governments 'Rapid Housing Initiative', to establish a transitional 24 housing unit community for Siksika's vulnerable high need families and youth in the process of cultural reunification. The community will be called "Children's Village".

Location
Its administrative and business district is located adjacent to the community of Gleichen.

Siksika Nation is the second largest, land-based, in Canada. Siksika Nation Boundaries of Blackfoot Confederacy Traditional Territory. 
North-North Saskatchewan River, West – Rock Mountains, East-At the confluence of the North and South Saskatchewan Rivers and South-Yellowstone River.

Land claims

The Siksika Nation has had a longstanding land claim dispute with the Government of Canada over events dating back to 1910. The cession included  of reserve lands to be transferred to the Canadian Pacific Railway, for construction of the Bassano Dam. The band members were not adequately informed about this portion and lost the use of the surface rights of the land. The Nation claims the transfer was done illegally. In 1980, the government admitted that no proof existed that Canadian Pacific had acquired the rights to the land for the dam.

The Nation entered into negotiations with the Canadian government to settle the land claim. In 1991, the Siksika Nation signed a $4.9m agreement with the government for compensation for mineral rights lost due to construction of the dam. In 2010, the Nation finally reached agreement with the governments of Canada and Alberta to settle the land claims. The band would receive $50 million and new water rights. The money will be put in a trust to benefit the Nation for purposes such as education and welfare.

1910 Global Settlement Agreement
The 6 decade process of land claims commenced in 1960 under the leadership of Siksika Chief Clarence McHugh in 1959. McHugh stated “They told us they would give us a bag of money which would never empty, but somehow, that bag developed a great big hole.” In reference to the late Minister of the Interior, Frank Oliver 
Who was instrumental in the disembowelment of 289,897 acres of First Nation's territorial integrity throughout his career. He advised First Nations to cede/surrender treaty territory throughout Canada in exchange for frequently reneged Federal concessions or cohesion such as denial of necessities such as food. He promised the Siksika: " It might be better to sell what they do not use for a big bag of money, which could give them money for ever and ever!". McHugh described the surrendering as '“They cut our reserve up like a Christmas turkey and wasted our money.”      A reporter described the desolation of Siksika as being 'ramshackle, uninsulated houses without foundations, with cracks and broken windows, patched up with rags and cardboard.', and the houses built from the 1912 initial sale as "almost falling apart". according to McHugh. 

In December 2021, Siksika members voted overwhelmingly at 77% (2682/3484 voters) in a referendum to ratify the '1910 Global Settlement Agreement'. An omnibus comprehensive resolution to multiple land claims and associated grievances with compensation of $ 1.3 B and entitlement to purchase 115,000 Acres from willing sellers. 

On June 2, 2022, in a ceremony at the Blackfoot Crossing Historical Park", the Federal government and the Siksika Nation signed the ' 1910 Global Settlement Agreement'. The conclusion of a 60 year process of ongoing negotiations to redress numerous land claims of illegal annexation and settlement of 115,000 acres (465.4 kmsq) of productive agricultural, ceremonial, and mineral Siksika territory and the mineral royalties in 1910. 

The money is distributed as: $20,000 for each band member, and essential priorities such as establishing a police force, education, infrastructure, and residential school searches.Bratt, T. (2022, June 2).'Siksika First Nation $1.3B land claim settlement addresses injustices of the past', CityNews retrieved from https://calgary.citynews.ca/2022/06/02/calgary-siksika-settlement/

Notable people
 Ouray Crowfoot, Chief of the Siksika Nation ( 2019). Signer of the '1910 Global Settlement Agreement'.
 Crowfoot, chief of the Siksika Nation ( 1885) and a signer of Treaty 7.
 Aatsista-Mahkan (Running Rabbit), portrayed in photo by Edward S. Curtis.
 Robin Big Snake, former professional hockey player, most recently with the Muskegon Lumberjacks during the 2009-10 International Hockey League season.
 Armond Duck Chief, country singer and songwriter.
 Gerald McMaster, artist, curator, and author.
 Adrian Stimson, interdisciplinary artist, 2018 Governor's General award winner in visual and media arts.
Maggie Black Kettle, storyteller, educator, dancer, actress, community leader

Chief and Council
Ouray Crowfoot, Samuel Crowfoot, Reuben Breaker, Ike Solway, Owen Crane Bear, Candace Backfat, Carlin Black Rabbit, Kendall Panther Bone, Hector Winnipeg, Strater Crowfoot, Marsha Wolf Collar, and Tracy McHugh.

Chief and Council Staff
Mariah Little Chief, Sharon Brass, Erica Sitting Eagle, Anthony Ola Koleoso, and Allison Duck Chief.

Tribal Administration Executives
Richard Sparvier, Van Le, Tom Many Heads, and Hossam Yaqoub.

Gallery

References

External links

Official Website of the Siksika Nation
Concise description of the Blackfoot tribes
Blackfoot Digital Library

 
First Nations in Alberta